Bauka (also, Bogas, Boka, and Booku) is a former Maidu settlement in Butte County, California, United States. It was located near Gridley on the right bank of Feather River; its precise location is unknown.

References

Maidu villages
Former settlements in Butte County, California
Former Native American populated places in California
Lost Native American populated places in the United States
Gridley, California